The Fraction of Upholders of the Proclamation was a parliamentary group in the Indonesian People's Representative Council, formed after the 1955 parliamentary election. The group included ten Members of Parliament. The group was politically heterogenous, but was somewhat pro-Masjumi/Socialist Party of Indonesia.

Members:
League of Upholders of Indonesian Independence (IPKI)
Labour Party (Partai Buruh)
Indonesian People's Party (PRI)
Village People's Party (PRD)
Party of the People of Free Indonesia (PRIM).

References

Defunct political parties in Indonesia
Liberal democracy period in Indonesia
Parliamentary groups
Political parties with year of disestablishment missing
Political parties with year of establishment missing
Political party alliances in Indonesia